"Morty's Mind Blowers" is the eighth episode of the third season of the American science fiction television series Rick and Morty. It follows the two titular characters, both voiced by Justin Roiland, as they experiment with the latter's lost memories. The episode was directed by Bryan Newton and written by various screenwriters, including Mike McMahan, who would later serve as a producer on the fourth season, and both series creators Roiland and Dan Harmon. "Morty's Mind Blowers" originally aired on Adult Swim on September 17, 2017, and was watched by 2.51 million viewers. A comic sequel of the same name, written by Kyle Starks, Tini Howard, Sarah Graley, Benjamin Dewey, and Josh Trujillo, with designs by Angie Knowles and Roiland's personal approval, was published by Oni Press in Rick and Morty #50 on May 29, 2019.

Plot 
After Morty requests to have a traumatic memory deleted, Rick reveals a room where he has been storing a number of memories he has removed from Morty's mind, including those about how he inadvertently drove an innocent man to suicide, or how he accidentally sent an alien to hell. However, as it turns out, besides the memories that Morty did not want to keep from their adventures, the room also contains memories in which Rick was made to look foolish, so he forcibly removed them from Morty. This revelation prompts a fight, during which Rick and Morty have their memories accidentally erased.

Morty scours the memories around him to replace the ones he lost, but he is displeased with the truth he finds, and convinces Rick that they should kill themselves. Summer enters the room moments before they commit suicide. At this point, it is revealed that Rick has a contingency plan in place for an occasion such as this. Following written instructions, Summer tranquilizes Rick and Morty, restores their memories, and drags them to the living room, placing them on the couch. Then Summer administers smelling salts to revive Rick and Morty. As they wake up, they're both angry at Summer, believing she allowed them to sleep through several shows on "Interdimensional Cable." In the post-credits scene, Jerry discovers a box labeled "Jerry's Mind Blowers", which contains a memory reminiscent of E.T. the Extra-Terrestrial where Jerry is accidentally responsible for the death of an alien.

Production 
The title of "Morty's Mind Blowers" was announced on August 28, 2017. The episode's writing and directorial credits were revealed upon its airing to be Bryan Newton as episode director, and Mike McMahan, James Siciliano, Ryan Ridley, Dan Guterman, Justin Roiland, and Dan Harmon as writers. The series' writers posted on Twitter on September 18, 2017, a day after the airing of the episode, that they had initially come up with "about a hundred mind blowers, then had to narrow it down and vote, then still wrote more."

The episode stars Roiland as Rick Sanchez and Morty Smith, Chris Parnell as Jerry Smith, Sarah Chalke as Beth Smith, and Spencer Grammer as Summer Smith. Jonas Briedis voices Zick Zack, an alien and part of the Floop Floopian race who believe there is an afterlife. In one of Morty's memories, it is shown that Morty leads Zack to believe that there is no afterlife. While proclaiming that he wants to live, he is killed and dragged to hell by demons. Gordon Lunas, a man Morty drives to kill himself before realizing that Lunas was actually a good person, is voiced by Maurice LaMarche. Phil Hendrie and Kari Wahlgren reprise their roles in the episode as series recurring characters Principal Gene Vagina and Jessica.

Reception

Viewing figures 
The episode was watched upon its air date by 2.51 million American viewers.

Critical response 
The season has an approval rating of 96% from Rotten Tomatoes based on 10 reviews, and an average rating of 8.95 out of 10, with the site's consensus: 

Zack Handlen of The A.V. Club praised the episode's uniqueness and the fact that it does not follow a single linear plot like the season premiere, "The Rickshank Rickdemption", however the review also noted that the show was "writing itself into a corner." Jesse Schedeen of IGN called the episode "a deep dive into all the horrible adventures Morty would just as soon (and did) forget. The results were amusing, but this episode still lacked the freshness of "Rixty Minutes"." The review, comparing the episode to the season two episode "Interdimensional Cable 2: Tempting Fate", also said it "is more entertaining than another "Interdimensional Cable 2" sequel likely would have been, but it's far from the strongest installment of the season. Nor is it a formula that demands its own sequel." Inverse called the episode "an entertaining alternate to "Interdimensional Cable 2" that’s a lot more fun than the random madness of alternate reality television, but these stories actually have an impact on how we perceive the show’s main characters," also posing the theory that the episode is set in an alternate universe from the rest of the show with an alternate version of Rick and Morty, as the episode implies that the two characters have "migrated" to a new dimension more than shown in previous episodes.

Den of Geek also compared and contrasted the episode to "Interdimensional Cable 2", saying "each sketch can’t start with a completely blank canvas. Rick and Morty have to be at the center of all of them, which, like the lack of ad-libbing, makes this a lot less of a freewheeling ride" and giving the episode overall 3.5 stars out of 5. In an episode review, Steve Greene of IndieWire said, "For a series that delights in its visual inventiveness, it’s hard to believe that this was the first time “Rick and Morty” ventured into the M.C. Escher zone, barely escaping a logic puzzle architectural trap with their bodies and minds intact."

References 

2017 television episodes
Rick and Morty episodes
Television episodes written by Dan Harmon